Zenia is a genus of plants in the family Fabaceae.  It belongs to the subfamily Dialioideae.

It contains the following species:
 Zenia insignis

References

Dialioideae
Fabaceae genera
Taxonomy articles created by Polbot